The Seattle George Monument, also known as Seattle, Washington Monument, is an outdoor 1989 sculpture by Buster Simpson, installed outside the Seattle Convention Center, north of 7th Avenue between Union and Pike Streets, in Seattle, Washington, in the United States.

Description and history 
The kinetic sculpture, which is made from aluminum, steel, painted metal, wire, English ivy, concrete, and mylar sheets, depicts Chief Seattle and George Washington. It was surveyed and deemed "treatment needed" by the Smithsonian Institution's "Save Outdoor Sculpture!" program in October 1994. The sculpture was designed to resemble the highway shields used by Washington's state highway system.

The sculpture rests on a trellis base under the suspended nose of a Boeing 707. Lines from Chief Seattle's farewell speech are etched in the base in English and phonetic Salish.

See also

 1989 in art
 List of monuments dedicated to George Washington

References

1989 establishments in Washington (state)
1989 sculptures
Aluminum sculptures in Washington (state)
Concrete sculptures in Washington (state)
Cultural depictions of George Washington
Kinetic sculptures in the United States
Monuments and memorials in Seattle
Monuments and memorials to George Washington in the United States
Outdoor sculptures in Seattle
Sculptures of Native Americans in Washington (state)
Sculptures of presidents of the United States
Steel sculptures in Washington (state)